Hart Park is a  park on the Menomonee River in Wauwatosa, Wisconsin. Created in 1921 and originally known as City Park, the park has a football/soccer field, baseball diamond, field house, several tennis courts, a skate park, and nature trails.  In 1960, to commemorate Wauwatosa's 125th anniversary, the common council named the park Charles Hart Park to recognize the city's founder.

A curling facility, sports fields, tennis courts and skating rink were established by 1926. The field house, constructed by the Works Progress Administration, opened in 1929.  The WPA made many improvements to the park, including the addition of stone walls, a new football field, bleachers, an indoor curling rink and a parking lot. The roller rink and baseball diamonds opened in 1942.

The athletic field is artificial turf and can host high school and college football, soccer, field hockey, and lacrosse.

It is currently used as the home field for the NCAA Marquette Golden Eagles lacrosse teams and, as of 2017, the Milwaukee Torrent soccer team of the NPSL and WPSL . 

Due to the COVID-19 pandemic, Hart Park hosted Forward Madison FC as their home venue for the 2020 USL League One season.

References

Protected areas of Milwaukee County, Wisconsin
1921 establishments in Wisconsin
Soccer venues in Wisconsin
College lacrosse venues in the United States
USL League One stadiums